Before the Acts of Union 1707, the barons of the shire of Dumbarton elected commissioners to represent them in the unicameral Parliament of Scotland and in the Convention of the Estates.

From 1708 Dumbartonshire was represented by one Member of Parliament in the House of Commons of Great Britain.

List of shire commissioners
 1593: Sir James Seton of Touch
 1593: Sir James Edmonstone of Duntreath
 1608: Sir Aulay MacAulay of Ardincaple
 1612: Alexander Colquhoun of Luss
 1617: William Semple of Fulwood
 1621: John Colquhoun of Luss
 1621: Henry Stirling of Ardoch
 1628–33, 1645, 1649 and 1651: Sir Ludovic Houston of that Ilk
 1630: name not known
 1633: James Muirhead of Lachop, yr
 1639–41, 1648: Duncan Campbell of Carrick
 1640–41; 1643–49: Sir Humphrey Colquhoun of Balvie
 1643, 1645–47, 1648–49: William Semple of Fulwood
 1650, 1661–63, 1665 convention, 1667 convention and 1669–74: Sir John Colquhoun of Luss
 1661–63, 1665 convention, 1667 convention, 1669–74: John Napier of Kilmahew
 1678 convention: William Hamilton of Orbiston
 1678 convention and 1681–82: Sir Patrick Houston of that Ilk
 1681–82: William Noble of Dalnotter
 1685–86: Nicoll Buntine of Ardoch
 1685–86: Alexander Gartshore of that Ilk
 1689 (convention), 1689–1702: Claude Hamilton of Barnes
 1689 (convention), 1689–98: William Colquhoun of Craigtoun
 1700–01: John Haldane of Gleneagles
 1702–07: William Cochrane of Kilmaranock
 1702–07: Sir Humphrey Colquhoun of Luss

References
 Margaret M. Young, The Parliaments of Scotland: Burgh and Shire Commissioners (Edinburgh, 1993) vol. 2, p. 792.

See also
 List of constituencies in the Parliament of Scotland at the time of the Union

Constituencies of the Parliament of Scotland (to 1707)
Constituencies disestablished in 1707
1707 disestablishments in Scotland
Politics of the Dunbartonshire